Keith Elwell (12 February 1950), also known by the nicknames of "The Mole", "Chiefy", and "The Ubiquitous Elwell", is an English former professional rugby league footballer who played in the 1970s and 1980s.

Background
Elwell's birth was registered in Warrington district, Lancashire, England.

Playing career

International honours
Keith Elwell won caps for England while at Widnes in 1978 against France, and Wales, and won caps for Great Britain while at Widnes in the 1977 Rugby League World Cup against Australia, and in 1980 against New Zealand (2 matches).

Challenge Cup Final appearances
Keith Elwell played  in Widnes' 14–7 victory over Warrington in the 1974-75 Challenge Cup Final during the 1974–75 season at Wembley Stadium, London on Saturday 10 May 1975, in front of a crowd of 85,998, played , and scored a drop goal in the 5–20 defeat by St. Helens in the 1975–76 Challenge Cup Final during the 1975–76 season at Wembley Stadium, London on Saturday 8 May 1976, in front of a crowd of 89,982, played  in the 7–16 defeat by Leeds in the 1976–77 Challenge Cup Final during the 1976–77 season at Wembley Stadium, London on Saturday 7 May 1977, in front of a crowd of 80,871, the 7–16 victory over Wakefield Trinity in the 1978–79 Challenge Cup Final during the 1978–79 season at Wembley Stadium, London on Saturday 5 May 1979, in front of a crowd of 94,218, played  in the 18–9 victory over Hull Kingston Rovers in the 1980–81 Challenge Cup Final during the 1980–81 season at Wembley Stadium, London on Saturday 2 May 1981, in front of a crowd of 92,496, played  in the 14–14 draw with Hull F.C. in the 1981–82 Challenge Cup Final during the 1981–82 season at Wembley Stadium, London on Saturday 1 May 1982, in front of a crowd of 92,147, played  in the 9–18 defeat by Hull F.C. in the 1981–82 Challenge Cup Final replay during the 1981–82 season at Elland Road, Leeds on Wednesday 19 May 1982, in front of a crowd of 41,171, played  in the 19–6 victory over Wigan in the 1983–84 Challenge Cup Final during the 1983–84 season at Wembley Stadium, London on Saturday 5 May 1984, in front of a crowd of 80,116.

County Cup Final appearances
Keith Elwell played  in Widnes' 6–2 victory over Salford in the 1974–75 Lancashire County Cup Final during the 1974–75 season at Central Park, Wigan on Saturday 2 November 1974, played  in the 16–11 victory over Workington Town in the 1976–77 Lancashire County Cup Final during the 1976–77 season at Central Park, Wigan on Saturday 30 October 1976, played  in the 15–13 victory over Workington Town in the 1978–79 Lancashire County Cup Final during the 1978–79 season at Central Park, Wigan on Saturday 7 October 1978, played , and scored a drop goal in the 11–0 victory over Workington Town in the 1979–80 Lancashire County Cup Final during the 1979–80 season at the Willows, Salford on Saturday 8 December 1979, played  in the 3–8 defeat by Leigh in the 1981–82 Lancashire County Cup Final during the 1981–82 season at Central Park, Wigan on Saturday 26 September 1981, and played  in the 8–12 defeat by Barrow in the 1983–84 Lancashire County Cup Final during the 1983–84 season at Central Park, Wigan on Saturday 1 October 1983.

BBC2 Floodlit Trophy Final appearances
Keith Elwell played  in Widnes' 0–5 defeat by Leigh in the 1972 BBC2 Floodlit Trophy Final during the 1972–73 season at Central Park, Wigan on Tuesday 19 December 1972, played  in the 7–15 defeat by Bramley in the 1973 BBC2 Floodlit Trophy Final during the 1973–74 season at Naughton Park, Widnes on Tuesday 18 December 1973, and played  in the 13–7 victory over St. Helens in the 1978 BBC2 Floodlit Trophy Final during the 1978–79 season at Knowsley Road, St. Helens on Tuesday 12 December 1978.

Player's No.6 Trophy/John Player/John Player Special Trophy Final appearances
Keith Elwell played  in Widnes' 2–3 defeat by Bradford Northern in the 1974–75 Player's No.6 Trophy Final during the 1974–75 season at Wilderspool Stadium, Warrington on Saturday 25 January 1975, played  in the 19–13 victory over Hull F.C. in the 1975–76 Player's No.6 Trophy Final during the 1975–76 season at Headingley Rugby Stadium, Leeds on Saturday 24 January 1976, played  in the 4–9 defeat by Warrington in the 1977–78 Players No.6 Trophy Final during the 1977–78 season at Knowsley Road, St. Helens on Saturday 28 January 1978, played , and scored 2-drop goals in the 16–4 victory over Warrington in the 1978–79 John Player Trophy Final during the 1978–79 season at Knowsley Road, St. Helens on Saturday 28 April 1979, played  in the 0–6 defeat by Bradford Northern in the 1979–80 John Player Trophy Final during the 1979–80 season at Headingley Rugby Stadium, Leeds on Saturday 5 January 1980, and played  in the 10–18 defeat by Leeds in the 1983–84 John Player Special Trophy Final during the 1983–84 season at Central Park, Wigan on Saturday 14 January 1984.

Open Rugby inaugural World XIII
The Open Rugby inaugural World XIII was revealed in June 1978, it was; Graham Eadie, John Atkinson, Steve Rogers, Jean-Marc Bourret, Green Vigo, Roger Millward, Steve Nash, Jim Mills, Keith Elwell, Steve Pitchford, Terry Randall, George Nicholls and Greg Pierce.

Career records
Keith Elwell holds Widnes' "Most Appearances in a Career" record with 591, he also holds the rugby league world record for consecutive games played with a total of 239 (242?) from the 1976–77 Challenge Cup Final against Leeds on Saturday 7 May 1977, to the match at Hull F.C. on Sunday 26 September 1982, 5-years 4-months and 19-days later.

Honoured at Widnes
Keith Elwell is a Widnes Hall of Fame Inductee.

References

External links
Statistics at rugby.widnes.tv
Hall Of Fame at rugby.widnes.tv

1950 births
Living people
Barrow Raiders players
England national rugby league team players
English rugby league players
Great Britain national rugby league team players
Lancashire rugby league team players
Rugby league fullbacks
Rugby league hookers
Rugby league players from Warrington
Widnes Vikings players